Dr. Mohamad Khir bin Toyo (born 6 August 1965) was the former Chief Minister of the state of Selangor in Malaysia from 2000 to 2008. His Barisan Nasional (BN) government was defeated in the 2008 general election, following which he served as the state's Opposition Leader until December 2010. He has been a member of the Selangor State Legislative Assembly since 1999, for the seat of Sungai Panjang. He faced charges of corruption after stepping down as Chief Minister, and was convicted of graft in the High Court on 23 December 2011.

Family
An ethnic Malay of half Javanese and half native Malay descent, Khir was born on 6 August 1965, at Tali Air 2, Bt 4, Sungai Burung, Tanjung Karang, Selangor, the fifth child of a total of nine siblings. His father, Toyo Erodikromo, was an immigrant from Java, Indonesia while his mother, Siti Aminah binti Mohd Taib, is of Malay ethnicity.

He married his first wife Zaharah Kechik in 1990 and they divorced on 19 September 2022. They have 3 sons and 3 daughters. He married his second wife Christine Zanitrah Abdullah (born Christine Tan) in 2016 and their have a son was born in 2019.

Before entering politics, Khir was a dentist by profession.

Career
Khir was active in the youth wing of the United Malays National Organisation (UMNO), serving on its executive council. In 2000, at the age of 35, he became the Menteri Besar of Selangor at the insistence of Prime Minister Mahathir Mohamad, following the resignation of Abu Hassan Omar. His appointment as Menteri Besar came in his first term as a member of the Selangor State Assembly, having been elected as the member for Sungai Panjang in the 1999 election. His young age led to allegations, which he denied, that he had dyed his hair grey to give voters the impression that he was older.

Khir subsequently served as a member of UMNO's Supreme Council and Chairman of Selangor Barisan Nasional from 2000 to 2008. In 2004, Dr. Mohamad Khir won UMNO Supreme Council with the highest votes. Other positions that he holds in UMNO include the Chairman of the Selangor UMNO Communications Board and UMNO Division Head of Sungai Besar.

He was the Menteri Besar of Selangor until the 12th General Election in March 2008. The state of Selangor fell to opposition hands following its worst defeat in Malaysian history. He was succeeded by Parti Keadilan Rakyat (PKR) secretary-general, Abdul Khalid Ibrahim. However, he remains the state assemblyman of Sungai Panjang constituency and became Selangor opposition chief. After the election, he ran for the leadership of UMNO Youth, but was defeated by Khairy Jamaluddin. He resigned as the opposition leader in December 2010, after he was charged with corruption over allegations that while he was the Menteri Besar, he was sold a lavish mansion for less than its market value.

Khir Toyo was finally sentenced to a jail term of 12 months for this act and his properties was ordered to be confiscated.

Khir Toyo's award of 'Darjah Kebesaran Seri Paduka Mahkota Selangor (SPMS) Kelas Pertama' with the title Dato' Seri which was conferred on him on 2001 was revoked by the Sultan of Selangor on 30 September 2015 after his conviction of corrupt practices was upheld by the Federal Court.

Desire to contest in general election for Sungai Besar federal seat
On 29 May 2022, he expressed his desire to contest in the next Malaysian general election for the Sungai Besar federal seat representing BN and UMNO to help his party and coalition to regain the seat after it was won by the Pakatan Harapan (PH) and Malaysian United Indigenous Party (BERSATU), then opposition coalition and party in the 2018 Malaysian general election. He also remarked that it was all up to the leadership of BN and UMNO to decide whether he or Minister of Finance Tengku Zafrul Aziz is nominated as candidate.On 28 September 2022, he stated that he was prepared to make a political comeback by contesting for the seat and regaining it from the present Sungai Besar MP Muslimin Yahaya of BERSATU and PN, who was also the Deputy Minister of Entrepreneur Development and Cooperative. He also revealed that he had worked hard in the constituency for the last three years and he would carry on serving the people even if not being nominated as a candidate for the seat. He also highlighted that he was warmly received by the people while attending events there, which he interpreted as an indication from the people to elect him as the Sungai Besar MP. Moreover, he also remarked that BN was unable to get 100% of Malay votes due to the expected fierce contest for the seat to represent the community and BN must come up with a different manifesto to contest in the state as it owned different demographics and economic status compared to the country.

Controversies and criticism

Zero Illegal Squatters Mission
It was a mission set by Khir Toyo himself to make Selangor 'zero squatters' in line with national policy Wawasan 2020. The opposition criticised Khir Toyo for approving housing project in squatters' area and forcing the residents to move out from their illegal homes. They claimed some of the village claim to be illegal homes had been built before independence in 1957 and most squatters living in a prime area are left homeless and received low compensation. The majority of the squatters are forced to rent or live in low-cost flats.

However report show most of the land is under private owner. "The (squatters) are occupying other people's land. The land will never be theirs as they are private land. They want the land but I can't give it to them" – Dr. Khir Toyo

Despite heavy criticism from opposition before this, the new Menteri Besar from opposition party, Tan Sri Abdul Khalid Ibrahim reported said the effort to reduce the number of squatters and to free them from the clutches of poverty, should continue.

In 2007, The state government had achieved 93.6 per cent success in addressing the squatter problem, having evicted 44,701 of the 47,756 squatter families to-date from all the local council areas in the state. The remaining squatters to be moved by August are 1,090 families from the Selayang Municipal Council (MPS) and 257 families from the Klang Municipal Council (MPK), the media secretariat in the Menteri Besar's Office said in a statement. A total of 1,708 squatter families were shifted following court cases, resettled to the North Gombak Orang Asli settlement and planned villages, it said. However, four local authorities still had squatters. They are MPS (984), MPK (221), Shah Alam City Council (307) and Ampang Jaya Municipal Council (196).

Bukit Cahaya Reserve
Khir Toyo had been accused of corruption (classic UMNO-style) for approving a construction project which trespasses Bukit Cahaya Seri Alam in Shah Alam, a forest reserve. However this land was approved before Khir took over power. To prove his innocence, Khir had asked Anti-Corruption Agency of Malaysia to investigate the incident.. In 2004, Anti-Corruption Agency declared no case against Khir Toyo.

Selangor State Development Corporation
On 30 October, the current State government of Selangor began investigations into irregularities by the Selangor State Development Corporation when it was run by Khir Toyo. A special investigative team which was set up for the purpose would probe how certain senior officers of the corporation were holding 30% shares in a subsidiary. This included an investigation of RM100,000 gift to former Menteri Besar as a bonus. In 2007, the state government only collected RM17mil revenue from sand mining instead of the RM170mil which it was supposed to get.

Election results

Honours

Honours of Malaysia 
  :
  (2001, revoked 2015)

See also
Sungai Panjang (state constituency)

References

External links

Khir Toyo's official blog
The official blog of Selangor opposition

Chief Ministers of Selangor
Malaysian people of Malay descent
Malaysian dentists
Living people
Malaysian people of Javanese descent
Malaysian Muslims
1965 births
Malaysian politicians convicted of corruption
People from Selangor
United Malays National Organisation politicians
Members of the Selangor State Legislative Assembly
Selangor state executive councillors
University of Malaya alumni
Malaysian politicians convicted of crimes